In mathematics and in particular the field of complex analysis,  Hurwitz's theorem is a theorem associating the zeroes of a sequence of holomorphic, compact locally uniformly convergent functions with that of their corresponding limit. The theorem is named after Adolf Hurwitz.

Statement

Let {fk} be a sequence of holomorphic functions on a connected open set G that converge uniformly on compact subsets of G to a holomorphic function f which is not constantly zero on G. If f has a zero of order m at z0 then for every small enough ρ > 0 and for sufficiently large k ∈ N (depending on ρ),  fk has precisely m zeroes in the disk defined by |z − z0| < ρ, including multiplicity.  Furthermore, these zeroes converge to z0 as k → ∞.

Remarks

The theorem does not guarantee that the result will hold for arbitrary disks. Indeed, if one chooses a disk such that f has zeroes on its boundary, the theorem fails. An explicit example is to consider the unit disk D and the sequence defined by

which converges uniformly to f(z) = z − 1. The function f(z) contains no zeroes in D; however, each fn has exactly one zero in the disk corresponding to the real value 1 − (1/n).

Applications

Hurwitz's theorem is used in the proof of the Riemann mapping theorem, and also has the following two corollaries as an immediate consequence:
 Let G be a connected, open set and {fn} a sequence of holomorphic functions which converge uniformly on compact subsets of G to a holomorphic function f. If each fn is nonzero everywhere in G, then f is either identically zero or also is nowhere zero.
 If {fn} is a sequence of univalent functions on a connected open set G that converge uniformly on compact subsets of G to a holomorphic function f, then either f is univalent or constant.

Proof 

Let f be an analytic function on an open subset of the complex plane with a zero of order m at z0, and suppose that {fn} is a sequence of functions converging uniformly on compact subsets to f.  Fix some ρ > 0 such that f(z) ≠ 0 in 0 < |z − z0| ≤ ρ. Choose δ such that |f(z)| > δ for z on the circle |z − z0| = ρ. Since fk(z) converges uniformly on the disc we have chosen, we can find N such that |fk(z)| ≥ δ/2 for every k ≥ N and every z on the circle, ensuring that the quotient fk′(z)/fk(z) is well defined for all z on the circle |z − z0| = ρ.  By  Weierstrass's theorem we have  uniformly on the disc, and hence we have another uniform convergence:

 

Denoting the number of zeros of fk(z) in the disk by Nk, we may apply the argument principle to find

 

In the above step, we were able to interchange the integral and the limit because of the uniform convergence of the integrand.  We have shown that Nk → m as k → ∞.  Since the Nk are integer valued, Nk must equal m for large enough k.

See also
Rouché's theorem

References 

 John B. Conway. Functions of One Complex Variable I. Springer-Verlag, New York, New York, 1978.
 E. C. Titchmarsh, The Theory of Functions, second edition (Oxford University Press, 1939; reprinted 1985), p. 119.

Theorems in complex analysis